Gabrielona is a genus of sea snails, marine gastropod mollusks in the family Phasianellidae.

Species
Species within the genus Gabrielona include:
 Gabrielona hadra (Woodring, 1928)
 Gabrielona nepeanensis (Gatliff & Gabriel, 1908)
 Gabrielona pisinna Robertson, 1973
 Gabrielona raunana Ladd, 1966
 Gabrielona roni Moolenbeek & Dekker, 1993
 Gabrielona sulcifera Robertson, 1973

References

 Williams S.T., Karube S. & Ozawa T. (2008) Molecular systematics of Vetigastropoda: Trochidae, Turbinidae and Trochoidea redefined. Zoologica Scripta 37: 483–506.

Phasianellidae